Baustelle is an indie rock band from Montepulciano, Italy.

Biography
Formed in the mid-'90s in the Tuscan town of Montepulciano, Italy, Baustelle (a German word that means "construction site" - or "building site" in English) didn't receive much mainstream attention for their first two albums, 2000's Sussidiario Illustrato della Giovinezza and 2003's La Moda del Lento. It was their third one, however, that finally brought them acclaim. Composed of leader Francesco Bianconi on vocals, guitar, and synths, Rachele Bastreghi on vocals and keys, Claudio Brasini on guitar, and Claudio Chiari on drums, the band released La Malavita on Warner Bros. Italy in 2005. Mixing the romantic sounds of British artists like the Smiths and Depeche Mode, with Italian composers like Ennio Morricone and Angelo Badalamenti and American acts like Television and Scott Walker, as well as with modern sounds of electronica and indie rock, the record gained immediate attention in the group's home country, resulting in an extensive nationwide tour. In 2010 the band release I Mistici dell'Occidente and in 2013 Fantasma.

Members
Francesco Bianconi - lyrics, vocals, guitar, keyboard
Rachele Bastreghi - vocals, keyboard, percussion
Claudio Brasini - guitar

Past members
Fabrizio Massara - keyboard, mastering
Claudio Chiari - drums, percussion

Discography
2000 - Sussidiario illustrato della giovinezza (Baracca e Burattini)
2003 - La moda del lento (Mi-Mo/Venus)
2005 - La malavita (Warner Bros. Records)
2008 - Amen (Warner Bros. Records) (Italy: Gold; 50,000+)
2010 - I Mistici Dell' Occidente (Warner Bros. Records) (Italy: Gold; 30,000+)
2013 - Fantasma (Warner Bros. Records)
2017 - L'amore e la violenza (Warner Bros. Records)

Singles
2003  Love affair
2004  Arriva lo ye-ye
2005  La guerra è finita
2006  Un romantico a Milano
2008  Charlie fa surf
2008  Colombo 
2008  Baudelaire
2010  Gli Spietati
2010  Le Rane
2010  Gomma 2010 version
2012  La morte (non esiste più)
2013  Nessuno
2013  Monumentale
2016  Lili Marleen
2016  Amanda Lear
2017  Il Vangelo di Giovanni
2017  Betty
2018  Veronica, n.2

Curiosity
The 10th track on the 2008 album Amen is Alfredo, a song about a well-known 1981 accident in which Alfredo Rampi lost his life.

Awards and nominations

References

External links

 Official website (Band)
 Official website Warner Music
 Official website Fabrizio Massara

Italian musical groups
People from Siena
Warner Records artists
Atlantic Records artists
Musical groups from Tuscany
Montepulciano